Information history may refer to the history of each of the categories listed below (or to combinations of them). It should be recognized that the understanding of, for example, libraries as information systems only goes back to about 1950. The application of the term information for earlier systems or societies is a retronym.

The word and concept "information"
The Latin roots and Greek origins of the word "information" is presented by Capurro & Hjørland (2003). References on "formation or molding of the mind or character, training, instruction, teaching" date from the 14th century in both English (according to Oxford English Dictionary) and other European languages. 
In the transition from Middle Ages to Modernity the use of the concept of information reflected a fundamental turn in epistemological basis – from "giving a (substantial) form to matter" to "communicating something to someone". Peters (1988, pp. 12–13) concludes:

Information was readily deployed in empiricist psychology (though it played a less important role than other words such as impression or idea) because it seemed to describe the mechanics of sensation: objects in the world inform the senses. But sensation is entirely different from "form" – the one is sensual, the other intellectual; the one is subjective, the other objective. My sensation of things is fleeting, elusive, and idiosyncratic [sic]. For Hume, especially, sensory experience is a swirl of impressions cut off from any sure link to the real world...  In any case, the empiricist problematic was how the mind is informed by sensations of the world. At first informed meant shaped by; later it came to mean received reports from. As its site of action drifted from cosmos to consciousness, the term's sense shifted from unities (Aristotle's forms) to units (of sensation). Information came less and less to refer to internal ordering or formation, since empiricism allowed for no preexisting intellectual forms outside of sensation itself. Instead, information came to refer to the fragmentary, fluctuating, haphazard stuff of sense. Information, like the early modern worldview in general, shifted from a divinely ordered cosmos to a system governed by the motion of corpuscles. Under the tutelage of empiricism, information gradually moved from structure to stuff, from form to substance, from intellectual order to sensory impulses.

In the modern era, the most important influence on the concept of information is derived from the Information theory developed by Claude Shannon and others. This theory, however, reflects a fundamental contradiction. Northrup (1993) wrote:

Thus, actually two conflicting metaphors are being used: The well-known metaphor of information as a quantity, like water in the water-pipe, is at work, but so is a second metaphor, that of information as a choice, a choice made by :an information provider, and a forced choice made by an :information receiver. Actually, the second metaphor implies that the information sent isn’t necessarily equal to the information received, because any choice implies a comparison with a list of possibilities, i.e., a list of possible meanings. Here, meaning is involved, thus spoiling the idea of information as a pure "Ding an sich." Thus, much of the confusion regarding the concept of information seems to be related to the basic confusion of metaphors in Shannon’s theory: is information an autonomous quantity, or is information always per SE information to an observer? Actually, I don’t think that Shannon himself chose one of the two definitions. Logically speaking, his theory implied information as a subjective phenomenon. But this had so wide-ranging epistemological impacts that Shannon didn’t seem to fully realize this logical fact. Consequently, he continued to use metaphors about information as if it were an objective substance. This is the basic, inherent contradiction in Shannon’s information theory." (Northrup, 1993, p. 5)

In their seminal book The Study of Information: Interdisciplinary Messages, Almach and Mansfield (1983) collected key views on the interdisciplinary controversy in computer science, artificial intelligence, library and information science, linguistics, psychology, and physics, as well as in the social sciences. Almach (1983, p. 660) himself disagrees with the use of the concept of information in the context of signal transmission, the basic senses of information in his view all referring "to telling something or to the something that is being told. Information is addressed to human minds and is received by human minds." All other senses, including its use with regard to nonhuman organisms as well to society as a whole, are, according to Machlup, metaphoric and, as in the case of cybernetics, anthropomorphic.

Hjørland (2007)  describes the fundamental difference between objective and subjective views of information and argues that the subjective view has been supported by, among others, Bate son, Yovits, Span-Hansen, Brier, Buck land, Goguen, and Hjørland. Hjørland provided the following example: 
A stone on a field could contain different information for different people (or from one situation to another). It is not possible for information systems to map all the stone’s possible information for every individual. Nor is any one mapping the one "true" mapping. But people have different educational backgrounds and play different roles in the division of labor in society. A stone in a field represents typical one kind of information for the geologist, another for the archaeologist. The information from the stone can be mapped into different collective knowledge structures produced by e.g. geology and archaeology. Information can be identified, described, represented in information systems for different domains of knowledge. Of course, there are much uncertainty and many and difficult problems in determining whether a thing is informative or not for a domain. Some domains have high degree of consensus and rather explicit criteria of relevance. Other domains have different, conflicting paradigms, each containing its own more or less implicate view of the informativeness of different kinds of information sources. (Hjørland, 1997, p. 111, emphasis in original).

Academic discipline
Information history is an emerging discipline related to, but broader than, library history. An important introduction and review was made by Alistair Black (2006).
A prolific scholar in this field is also Toni Weller, for example, Weller (2007, 2008, 2010a and 2010b). As part of her work Toni Weller has argued that there are important links between the modern information age and its historical precedents. A description from Russia is Volodin (2000).

Alistair Black (2006, p. 445) wrote: "This chapter explores issues of discipline definition and legitimacy by segmenting information history into its various components: 
 The history of print and written culture, including relatively long-established areas such as the histories of libraries and librarianship, book history, publishing history, and the history of reading.
 The history of more recent information disciplines and practice, that is to say, the history of information management, information systems, and information science.
 The history of contiguous areas, such as the history of the information society and information infrastructure, necessarily enveloping communication history (including telecommunications history) and the history of information policy.
 The history of information as social history, with emphasis on the importance of informal information networks."

"Bodies influential in the field include the American Library Association’s Round Table on Library History, the Library History Section of the International Federation of Library Associations and Institutions (IFLA), and, in the U.K., the Library and Information History Group of the Chartered Institute of Library and Information Professionals (CILIP). Each of these bodies has been busy in recent years, running conferences and seminars, and initiating scholarly projects. Active library history groups function in many other countries, including Germany (The Wolfenbuttel Round Table on Library History, the History of the Book and the History of Media, located at the Herzog August Bibliothek), Denmark (The Danish Society for Library History, located at the Royal School of Library and Information Science), Finland (The Library History Research Group, University of Tamepere), and Norway (The Norwegian Society for Book and Library History). Sweden has no official group dedicated to the subject, but interest is generated by the existence of a museum of librarianship in Bods, established by the Library Museum Society and directed by Magnus Torstensson. Activity in Argentina, where, as in Europe and the U.S., a "new library history" has developed, is described by Parada (2004)." (Black (2006, p. 447).

Journals 
 Information & Culture (previously Libraries & the Cultural Record, Libraries & Culture)
 Library & Information History (until 2008: Library History; until 1967: Library Association. Library History Group. Newsletter)

Information technology (IT)
The term IT is ambiguous although mostly synonym with computer technology. Haigh (2011, pp. 432-433) wrote 
"In fact, the great majority of references to information technology have always been concerned with computers, although the exact meaning has shifted over time (Kline, 2006). The phrase received its first prominent usage in a Harvard Business Review article (Haigh, 2001b; Leavitt & Whisler, 1958) intended to promote a technocratic vision for the future of business management. Its initial definition was at the conjunction of computers, operations research methods, and simulation techniques. Having failed initially to gain much traction (unlike related terms of a similar vintage such as information systems, information processing, and information science) it was revived in policy and economic circles in the 1970s with a new meaning. Information technology now described the expected convergence of the computing, media, and telecommunications industries (and their technologies), understood within the broader context of a wave of enthusiasm for the computer revolution, post-industrial society, information society (Webster, 1995), and other fashionable expressions of the belief that new electronic technologies were bringing a profound rupture with the past. As it spread broadly during the 1980s, IT increasingly lost its association with communications (and, alas, any vestigial connection to the idea of anybody actually being informed of anything) to become a new and more pretentious way of saying "computer". The final step in this process is the recent surge in references to "information and communication technologies" or ICTs, a coinage that makes sense only if one assumes that a technology can inform without communicating".

Some people use the term information technology about technologies used before the development of the computer. This is however to use the term as a retronym.

See also
 History of computer and video games
 History of computing hardware (1960s-present)
 History of computing hardware
 History of operating systems
 History of software engineering
 History of programming languages
 History of artificial intelligence
 History of the graphical user interface
 History of the Internet
 History of the World Wide Web
 IT History Society
 Timeline of computing

Information society

"It is said that we live in an "Age of Information," but it is an open scandal that there is no theory, nor even definition, of information that is both broad and precise enough to make such an assertion meaningful." (Goguen, 1997).

The Danish Internet researcher Niels Ole Finnemann (2001) developed a general history of media. He wrote: "A society cannot exist in which the production and exchange of information are of only minor significance. For this reason one cannot compare industrial societies to information societies in any consistent way. Industrial societies are necessarily also information societies, and information societies may also be industrial societies." He suggested the following media matrix:

 Oral cultures based mainly on speech.
 Literate cultures: speech + writing (primary alphabets and number systems).
 Print cultures: speech + written texts + print.
 Mass-media cultures: speech + written texts + print + analogue electric media.
 Second-order alphabetic cultures: speech + written texts + print + analogue electric media + digital media.

Information science

Many information science historians cite Paul Otlet and Henri La Fontaine as the fathers of information science with the founding of the International Institute of Bibliography (IIB) in 1895 Institutionally, information science emerged in the last part of the 19th century as documentation science which in general shifted name to information science in the 1960s.

Heting Chu (2010) classified the history and development of information representation and retrieval (IRR) in four phases. "The history of IRR is not long. A retrospective look at the field identifies increased demand, rapid growth, the demystification phase, and the networked era as the four major stages IRR has experienced in its development:" 

 Increased Demand (1940s–early 1950s) (Information explosion)
 Rapid Growth (1950s–1980s) (the emergence of computers and systems such as Dialog (online database))
 Demystification Phase (1980s–1990s) (systems developed for end-user searching)
 The Networked Era (1990s–Present) (search engines such as AltaVista and Google)

References

Further reading
 Cortada, James W. All the Facts: A History of Information in the United States since 1870 (Oxford UP, 2016). xx, 636 pp

External links
 Pioneers of Information Science in North America
 Chronology of Information Science and Technology 
 History of Information Science and Technology 
 Library and Information History Group (CILIP)

Fields of history